Magdalena Moncada (d. 1670), was a Spanish courtier.  

She was the lady-in-waiting of the queen of Spain, Mariana of Austria from 1648. She became an influential favorite and confidant of the queen, and used it to benefit the careers of protegees.

References

1670 deaths
Spanish ladies-in-waiting
17th-century Spanish women